Pisay Pao (born November 1, 1984) is an American actress. She is best known for her role as Cassandra in the Syfy series Z Nation.

Early life 
Pao was born on November 1, 1984 in Thailand, at a refugee camp where her Cambodian parents were placed to escape political persecution  during the Cambodian Civil War. Her parents were granted political asylum in the United States in 1986, and settled in Seattle, Washington, where she was raised. Pao stated that she was attracted to the arts from an early age, and began painting, drawing, dancing, and performing as a child. She obliged her parents' wishes to focus on an academic career instead, earning a scholarship to attend the University of Washington. However, she left her university course to instead pursue a career in fashion and the performing arts.

Career
Pao was introduced to a talent agent through a friend that was a model. Pao stated that she exercised several times per week to prepare for her role in the TV series Z Nation. Pao reportedly often attends comic book conventions to meet fans, and has expressed her wish to portray Marvel Comics super hero Storm.

Personal life
Pao has stated that her parents' struggle to escape the Cambodian civil war is an inspiration for her work.

Pao is also a Christian. 

Pao has travelled to Cambodia to visit her family members who remained there. Her first trip was in 2001.

Pao is a self-professed advocate for women's rights. She has stated that she "wants to find a way to bring justice for all women who are victims of sexual violence."

Filmography

Film

Television

Video games

References

External links
 

21st-century American actresses
Actresses from Seattle
American Christians
American film actresses
American television actresses
American people of Cambodian descent
Living people
1984 births